Lough Cullaunyheeda is a freshwater lake in the Mid-West Region of Ireland. It is located in east County Clare.

Geography

See also
List of loughs in Ireland

References

Cullaunyheeda